Sir Holburt Jacob Waring, 1st Baronet, CBE, FRCS (3 October 1866 – 10 February 1953) was a surgeon at St Bartholomew's Hospital, London and was vice-chancellor of the University of London from 1922 to 1924.

Early life
He was born in Chorley, Lancashire, the eldest son of Isaac Waring, a schoolmaster, and his wife, Catherine Holburt. He attended Owen's College, Manchester, (now the University of Manchester) and gained a BSc in physiology (1888), an MB (1890) in medicine and forensic medicine, a BS (1891) and MS in 1893. He became FRCS in 1891.

Career
He was demonstrator of anatomy and teacher of surgery at St Bartholomews and rose to become consulting surgeon.

During the First World War he was a colonel in the Royal Army Medical Corps and consulting surgeon in addition to his hospital work. He was an officer of the Légion d'honneur.

He represented the Faculty of Medicine in the Senate of the University of London and in 1920 he was elected dean of the Faculty of Medicine, and was vice-chancellor of the University from 1922–24. He was also the first vice-president of the St Bartholomew's Hospital Medical College and instrumental in getting it affiliated to the university.

He was elected President of the Medical Society of London (1925–26) and in 1935 was elected president of the Royal College of Surgeons of England, serving until 1937.

Personal life
He was awarded CBE in 1919, knighted in 1925 and became a baronet in 1935.

In 1900 he married Annie Cassandra (d 1948) and they had a son, Alfred Harold (1902–1981), who was a research engineer at ICI.

He died at his home in Tidenham, Gloucestershire, in 1953.

See also
 Waring baronets
 List of Vice-Chancellors of the University of London

References
Note : It is unclear from the two references if the degrees were Manchester or London degrees and, if the latter, where Waring did his studies. London awarded degrees externally to several institutions at the time.

1866 births
1953 deaths
People from Chorley
Alumni of the University of Manchester
English surgeons
Fellows of the Royal College of Surgeons
Vice-Chancellors of the University of London
Baronets in the Baronetage of the United Kingdom
Commanders of the Order of the British Empire
Knights Bachelor
People from Tidenham